Shir Meir Tzedek (Hebrew: שיר מאיר צדק; born 22 August 1989) is an Israeli footballer currently playing for Maccabi Netanya.

Early life
Tzedek was born in Beit Alfa, Israel, to a Jewish family.

Club career
Tzedek started his career at Hapoel Beit She'an and Maccabi Netanya. At 2009 moved to Hapoel Ironi Kiryat Shmona. On 28 October 2008 he made his debut at the senior team, at the 1–2 loss to Bnei Sakhnin at Toto Cup. One season later, he became a regular player in the team, and he won with the team at the Toto Cup Leumit, and promoted back to the Premier League.

During 2010–11 and 2011–12 seasons, he won twice at the Toto Cup and at the first club's championship. At 2012–13 season he was a partner in an increase to the Group stage of UEFA Europa League and the Israel State Cup final. 2013–14 season Tzedek became the club captain, and that season won the Israel State Cup.

International career
On 29 February 2012 he made his debut at Israel national team against Ukraine at exhibition game.

Honours

Player
Club
Hapoel Ironi Kiryat Shmona
Toto Cup (2): 2010–11, 2011–12
Toto Cup Leumit (1): 2009–10
Liga Leumit (1): 2009–10
Israeli Premier League (1): 2011–12
Israel State Cup (1): 2013–14

Hapoel Beer Sheva
Israeli Premier League (2): 2015-16 ,2016-17
Israel Super Cup (1): 2016
Toto Cup (1): 2016-17

References

External links

Stats at One.co.il 

1989 births
Living people
Israeli footballers
Israeli Jews
Hapoel Ironi Kiryat Shmona F.C. players
Hapoel Be'er Sheva F.C. players
Maccabi Netanya F.C. players
Israeli Premier League players
Liga Leumit players
Footballers from Northern District (Israel)
Israel international footballers
Association football central defenders
Doping cases in association football
Israeli people of Iranian-Jewish descent
Israeli people of Turkish-Jewish descent
Israeli people of Belarusian-Jewish descent